Banda may refer to:

People
Banda (surname)
Banda Prakash (born 1954), Indian politician
Banda Kanakalingeshwara Rao (1907–1968), Indian actor
Banda Karthika Reddy (born 1977), Indian politician
Banda Singh Bahadur (1670–1716), Sikh warrior

Places

Argentina 
 Banda Department, a part of Santiago del Estero Province, Argentina

Canada 
Banda, Ontario, a settlement in Ontario

Ghana 
 Banda Ahenkro, a town in Banda District
 Banda District, Ghana, a district in the Bono Region
 Banda (Ghana parliament constituency), a constituency in the Bono Region

India 
Banda, East Godavari district, a village in Andhra Pradesh, India
Banda, Maharashtra, a small town in Maharashtra
Banda, Uttar Pradesh, a city and district headquarters of Banda District, Uttar Pradesh
Banda District, India, a district in Uttar Pradesh
Banda (Lok Sabha constituency), Uttar Pradesh
Banda (Assembly constituency), a constituency of the Uttar Pradesh Legislative Assembly
Banda (Vidhan Sabha constituency), Madhya Pradesh

Indonesia 
Banda Islands, a group of ten small volcanic islands in the Banda Sea
Banda Sea, the sea of the South Moluccas, a part of the Pacific Ocean

Uganda 
Banda, Uganda, a hill and the neighbourhood on that hill, located in Nakawa Division, within the city of Kampala

Music
"A Banda (Ah Bahn-da)", a composition by Chico Buarque 
Banda music, a form of Mexican music
Banda (opera), a musical ensemble which is used in addition to the main opera orchestra and plays the music which is actually heard by the characters in the opera

Other uses
Banda people, an ethnic group of the Central African Republic, the Democratic Republic of Congo, Cameroon, and Sudan
Banda languages, a family of Ubangian languages of Central Africa
Banda language (Maluku), an Austronesian language of the Kei Islands, Indonesia
Banda machine, a brand of spirit duplicator - a type of low-volume document copying machine
Banda (state), a former princely state in India
Banda, a large smoked fish in Chad
Banda, a caste of adivasis in Odisha, Chhattisgarh, and Jharkhand
Banda Deul, an 11th-century temple in Purulia district, West Bengal, India

See also
 Bandar (disambiguation)
 Bande (disambiguation)
 Bandha (disambiguation)
 La Banda (disambiguation)